The treaty of Vienna, concluded on 1 December 1656, was an Austro–Polish alliance during the Second Northern War. Habsburg emperor Ferdinand III agreed to enter the war on the anti-Swedish side and support the Polish king John II Casimir with 4,000 troops. The treaty was, however, dissatisfying for John II Casimir, who had hoped for more substantial aid, and further ineffective as Ferdinand III died three days after giving his signature. A similar, but more effective alliance was concluded by Ferdinand III's successor Leopold I in the Treaty of Vienna (1657).

References

Second Northern War
Vienna (1656)
Vienna (1656)
1656 treaties
1656 in Europe
1656 in the Habsburg monarchy
1656 in the Polish–Lithuanian Commonwealth
1656 in Sweden
17th century in Vienna
Habsburg monarchy–Polish–Lithuanian Commonwealth relations